Arthur Lowder (11 February 1863 – 4 January 1926) was an English international footballer of the 1880s and 1890s who played as a left half with Wolverhampton Wanderers.

He joined Wolverhampton Wanderers (Wolves) in 1882 from St Luke's. As a player he was an extremely hard but fair tackler, preferring the left–half berth although occasionally figuring in the forward line. He appeared in Wolverhampton Wanderers first–ever FA Cup tie in 1883. He wasn't a tall man, standing 5 ft 5ins tall, yet he loved a challenge and never gave an inch.

Arthur Lowder, playing as a wing–half,  made his League debut on 8 September 1888, at Dudley Road, the then home of  Wolverhampton Wanderers . The visitors were Aston Villa  and the match ended as a 1–1 draw. Arthur Lowder scored his debut and only League goal on 26 January 1889 at Dudley Road,  against Everton. Wolverhampton Wanderers won the match 5-0 and Arthur Lowder scored the opening goal. Lowder appeared in 18 of the 22 League matches played by Wolverhampton Wanderers during the 1888–89 season and scored one goal. Playing as a wing–half (16 appearances) he was part of a midfield that achieved a big (three-League-goals-or-more) win on five separate occasions. He also played in the 1889 FA Cup Final as Wolverhampton Wanderers lost to Preston North End 3–0.

Lowder was capped on one occasion by the England national football team, playing against Wales at Stoke-on-Trent on 23 February 1889. He was chosen to play in the match following the withdrawal of Alf Shelton.

Arthur Lowder retired through injury in October 1891. In later years he went over to Europe where he coached in France, Germany and Norway, before returning to England in 1924 to become Chairman of the Brewood Parish Council, a position he held for 12 years. Lowder died in Taunton, Somerset, on 4 January 1926

Arthur Lowder made a total of 71 competitive appearances (46 in the Football League) for them (scoring 3 goals - 1League goal), before retiring in 1891.

Honours
Wolves
FA Cup finalists: 1889

References

1863 births
1926 deaths
Footballers from Wolverhampton
English footballers
Association football wing halves
England international footballers
English Football League players
Wolverhampton Wanderers F.C. players
FA Cup Final players